Danielle Gloria Kamesha Small (born 16 March 1989) is a Barbadian cricketer who plays as a right-handed batter and right-arm off break bowler. Between 2008 and 2010, she appeared in 12 One Day Internationals and 5 Twenty20 Internationals for the West Indies, and she was part of their squad during the 2009 Women's Cricket World Cup. She played domestic cricket for Barbados.

References

External links

1989 births
Living people
Barbadian women cricketers
West Indies women One Day International cricketers
West Indies women Twenty20 International cricketers
West Indian women cricketers